In the ethmoid bone, a sickle shaped projection, the uncinate process, projects posteroinferiorly from the ethmoid labyrinth.
Between the posterior edge of this process and the anterior surface of the ethmoid bulla, there is a two-dimensional space, resembling a crescent shape. This space continues laterally as a three-dimensional slit-like space - the ethmoidal infundibulum. This is bounded by the uncinate process, medially, the orbital lamina of ethmoid bone (lamina papyracea), laterally, and the ethmoidal bulla, posterosuperiorly. This concept is easier to understand if one imagine the infundibulum as a prism so that its medial face is the hiatus semilunaris. The "lateral face" of this infundibulum contains the ostium of the maxillary sinus, which, therefore, opens into the infundibulum.

Variations

The uncinate process can be attached to either the lateral nasal wall, on the lamina papyracea (50%), the anterior cranial fossa, on the ethmoidal roof (25%), or the middle concha (25%). The superior attachment of the uncinate process determines the drainage pattern of the frontal sinus. In the first case, the infundibulum and the frontal recess are separated from each other, forcing the frontal sinus to drain directly into the middle meatus and not into the ethmoidal infundibulum. With the other configurations, the sinus will drain, firstly, into the infundibulum.

References

G., Arun et alli (2017) - Anatomical variations in superior attachment of uncinate process and localization of frontal sinus outflow tract. International Journal of Otorhinolaryngology and Head and Neck Surgery, 3(2):176-179

P.S., Hechl et alli (1997) - The hiatus semilunaris and infundibulum. Endoscopic Anatomy of the Paranasal Sinuses. Springer, Vienna

External links
  - "The bones of the lateral nasal wall."

Bones of the head and neck